Castelletto di Branduzzo is a comune (municipality) in the Province of Pavia in the Italian region Lombardy, located about  south of Milan and about  southwest of Pavia.

Castelletto di Branduzzo borders the following municipalities: Bastida Pancarana, Bressana Bottarone, Casatisma, Lungavilla, Pancarana, Pizzale, Verretto.

References

Cities and towns in Lombardy